R v Clinton [2012] EWCA Crim 2, is a judgment of the Court of Appeal of England and Wales.

Judgment 
The judgment was delivered on 17 January 2012, by the Lord Chief Justice, Igor Judge with Justice Henriques and Justice Gloster concurring.

Commentary 
Vera Baird described the judgment as a "totemic setback for campaigning women".

References

Further reading 

 
 
 

2012 in case law
2012 in British law
Court of Appeal (England and Wales) cases